Mazhathullikkilukkam is a 2002 Indian Malayalam-language comedy-drama film directed by the Akbar-Jose duo. The film stars Dileep, Navya Nair, Sharada and Bharathi. 
The movie was produced by Sharada under the banner of Sharada Productions and was distributed by Sargam Speed Release.

Plot 
The story starts when Soloman and his sister travel to Kannadahalli, a village in Karnataka to meet two retired teachers. He reaches the house on top of a hill-"Swargam" where he finds two old women who live alone with a cook and a home nurse to look after them. Anna and Alice are sisters who are spinsters and they own the huge estate. The home nurse, Sophiya, cook, cook's son and the priest are the only people close to them. Soloman takes charge as the manager of the estate and soon wins over the two oldies.

He realizes that they are two angels and he tries to bring back joy into their morbid life. Soon, Soloman becomes the apple of their eye and they both consider him as their own son. Meanwhile, he falls in love with the home nurse Sophiya with whom he had regular fights. Their wedding is fixed and the sisters give away all their wealth to both of them. The real twist in the story occurs when Sophiya reveals to Soloman that her brother was a photographer who got murdered by some drug addict students.

Then during a flashback it is revealed, Soloman has a dark and disturbing past. Soloman is actually falsely accused in a murder case of the photographer and is hiding from the police. Soloman is filled with guilt and decides to leave the place on the pretext of higher education abroad. Sophiya overhears a conversation between Soloman and his sister. Unaware of all this, Soloman goes to the teachers and insists on them having payasam from him.

Meanwhile, a very guilty Sophiya confesses to the priest about what she heard and that she had poisoned Soloman's payasam. Just then Soloman visits the priest and learns all this. Soloman rushes back only to find the two teachers dead. Soloman takes the punishment for Sophie and when he comes out he goes to the tombs of Anna and Alice John where he meets Sophie. The story ends with them deciding to live together.

Cast

Soundtrack
The songs in the movie has been composed by Suresh Peters with lyrics by R. Rameshan Nair. The BGM has been done by Ouseppachan. The songs were distributed by Super Star Audios.

References

External links 
 

2002 films
Films scored by Suresh Peters
2000s Malayalam-language films